Khriska Peycheva (born 2 January 1955) is a Bulgarian former swimmer. She competed in the women's 100 metre freestyle at the 1972 Summer Olympics.

References

External links
 

1955 births
Living people
Bulgarian female swimmers
Olympic swimmers of Bulgaria
Swimmers at the 1972 Summer Olympics
Sportspeople from Varna, Bulgaria
Bulgarian female freestyle swimmers